Walter Horace Cottingham (8 January 1866 – 12 March 1930) was a Canadian businessman who led the global expansion of Sherwin-Williams Company as the second president and chairman from 1909 to 1930.

Cottingham was also the owner and chairman of Lewis Berger & Sons as well as the director of the Cleveland Box Co., Ozark Smelting Co., and the Cleveland Trust Company.

Early life
Cottingham was born on 8 January 1866 in Omemee, Ontario to an English father and an Irish mother. At the age of six, he lost his mother and two years later his father passed away too.

After the death of his parents, Cottingham started to live with his sister and was received education from public schools. He also started working as a clerk in a hardware shop in Peterboro, Ontario, when he was fifteen years old. Following year, he moved to Montreal where he worked in a hardware and paint store for four years.

Career
Walter Cottingham, then 21 years old, started his own business manufacturing gold paints after purchasing the formula for $25. In 1891, he organized his business as Walter H. Cottingham & Company. He became the Canadian agent for Sherwin-Williams & Company in 1892, which led to the establishment of Walter H. Cottingham Co. to manufacture Sherwin-Williams products in Canada.

In 1896, Cottingham engineered a merger between his own company and Sherwin-Williams & Company. He was appointed to the board of directors and the manager of the Canadian branch. Two years later, Cottingham was brought to Cleveland by Henry Sherwin and Edward Williams to become the consolidated company's general manager. In 1903, he was added the title and responsibilities of vice president.

In 1909, Cottingham was elected as the second president of Sherwin-Williams after the retirement of the Henry Sherwin. During his tenure, Sherwin–Williams' revenues grew from $2.3 million to $34.2 million, generated by 600 different products. In 1917, under Cottingham's leadership, the company purchased the Chicago-based Martin-Senour Company. The corporation went public three years later, in 1920, with the sale of $15 million in preferred shares. The proceeds from the transaction were used to buy the Detroit-based Acme Quality Paint Company, as well as a new plant in Oakland, California, and expand several existing operations.

Throughout his career, Cottingham worked hard to motivate his employees to reach their full potential. Cottingham was skilled at launching effective sales campaigns. He was also a writer and orator who published a number of "inspirational" editorials and writings on various topics.

In 1922, Cottingham resigned from the presidency to become chairman of the board and was succeeded by George A. Martin as the third president. Cottingham moved to his estate, Wooley Hall, in Maidenhead, England and managed his business interests including Lewis Berger & Sons.

In March 1930, he died in Berkshire, England. He was interred at Lake View Cemetery in Cleveland.

Personal life
On May 22, 1888, Cottingham married Gertrude Bennett and they had four children: Gladys, Gertrude, Sherwin (who later married Maggie Teyte), and William.

References

1866 births
1930 deaths
Canadian business executives